The raid at Altenburg on 28 September 1813 took place during the War of the Sixth Coalition's Allied autumn campaign in Saxony. The raid was carried out by the Streifkorp under the command of Saxon General Johann von Thielmann commanding seven regiments of Cossacks, a squadron each of Saxon Hussars and Dragoons, and a detachment of Saxon Freikorps numbering about 1,500 cavalry. The objective of the raid was to attempt harassment of the French lines of communication 25 miles (45 km) south of Leipzig shortly before the Battle of Leipzig.

Thielmann completely surprised and routed a larger force of French cavalry, including Cavalry of the Imperial Guard and a small force of 2nd Baden Infantry Regiment (Infanterie-Regiment No.2 ‘Markgraf Wilhelm’) nominally under the command of Lefebvre-Desnouettes numbering some 6,500. The French, completely surprised, broke and fled from Altenburg losing a third of their number (2,100), in the process running over the Baden infantry which was taken prisoner despite attempting to resist. Thielmann's force lost about 200 in casualties.

References

Sources
 Riley, J.P., Chandler, David G., (forward), Napoleon and the World War of 1813: Lessons in coalition warfighting, Frank Cass, London, 2000
 Anonymous, translated and edited by Geert van Uythoven, “Notizen über die Theilnahme der Groβherzogl. Badischen Truppen an der Schlacht bei Leipzig 1813”, in ‘Militair-Wochenblatt’, 15. Jahrgang, Berlin 1830 

Battles of the Napoleonic Wars
Battles involving Russia
Battles involving Saxony
Battles involving France
Conflicts in 1813
1813 in Europe
Military raids
Raid
September 1813 events
Battles in Thuringia